Richard Carl Mount (born January 5, 1947) is a former American basketball player in the American Basketball Association (ABA). He was the first high school athlete to be featured on the cover of Sports Illustrated.

Early life
Rick Mount's father, Pete, was an avid basketball player who intended Rick to learn the game as well. He cut out the bottom of a peanut can so Rick could shoot tennis balls through it. Rick's first time playing with an official basketball goal was during the fourth grade. He was known to beat 8th and 9th graders. However, when it was time to try out for the school basketball team, he wasn't able to make a standard left-hand lay up, which was a requirement for making the roster. That very night he practiced for hours until he had it down, and on the next day of tryouts, he made the team.

During the summers, Rick worked as a lifeguard. Learning by repetition, he would shoot for hours at a time between shifts at the local Memorial Park. He gave kids ice cream money to help retrieve loose balls. After the likes of Ken Sailors, Glen Roberts and Paul Arizin, Rick later helped establish the idealistic jump shot form before it was ever textbook, influencing a number of future shooters at all levels in the sport.

High school career
Rick "the Rocket" Mount attended Lebanon High School in Lebanon, Indiana. There, he led his team in scoring, including 33.1 ppg throughout his junior and senior seasons. His game started to attract national attention. In 1965, Lebanon played Crawfordsville High School at Hinkle Fieldhouse in Indianapolis, Indiana. With 10,000 people in attendance, the team made enough money to buy a bus. He scored 57 points in the game. On February 14, 1966, Mount became the first high school athlete to appear on the cover of Sports Illustrated, which featured him standing in front of a barn located in his Boone County homeland. At the end of his senior year, he won the Indiana "Mr. Basketball" award and was named "USA Basketball Yearbook Player of the Year," given to the nation's best high school player. He finished his Lebanon career with 2,595 points, at the time the second-highest total in Indiana high school history; as of December 2021 he is seventh.

College career

1966–67 season

Mount was considering committing to University of Miami (Florida).

As a freshman, Mount was unable to play on the varsity team due to NCAA regulations then in effect. Rick scored 33 points in a scrimmage against the varsity team in front of 9,500 in attendance at Lambert Fieldhouse. He averaged 35 points a game while shooting 54.5 percent on the freshman squad, tallying 490 points.

1967–68 season

In his first varsity game, Mount scored a game-high 28 points in a last-second, two-point loss to a top-ranked UCLA team and Lew Alcindor. It was also the first game played in Mackey Arena. Averaging 28.4 points a game and leading Purdue to a 15-9 record, he was named a Second Team All-American and First Team All-Big Ten his sophomore season.  Following the U.S. Olympic Trials in April, he was selected as an Alternate to the U.S. National Team.

1968–69 season

In his junior season at Purdue, along with seniors Billy Keller and Herm Gilliam, he led the Boilermakers to a Big Ten Conference title and the school's first NCAA tournament appearance, leading to the NCAA Finals game where they lost to a Lew Alcindor-led UCLA.

In a win against Marquette to bring the Boilers to the Final Four, Mount is remembered for his "leaping lofter" game-winning shot with two seconds left in overtime. He led all scorers in the tournament with a 40.6 point average in Purdue's three games. Purdue led the nation with 94.8 points a game during the 1968-69 season fronted by Mount's 33.3 a game. A regular season highlight was defeating Indiana 120-76 in the final game of the regular season, establishing a school record for most points in a game.

Rick had a keen eye on telling if a goal wasn't balanced. He twice had officials adjust the same goal prior to the NCAA Finals game at Freedom Hall in Louisville, Kentucky. He went through the same procedure earlier in the season before a game at Iowa. He led Purdue to a 23-5 record on the season. He shot 51.5 percent on the season, whereas well-known scorers such as Pete Maravich and Calvin Murphy shot no better than 46 percent. He was selected as a First Team All-American and the Big Ten Player Of The Year.

1969–70 season

In his senior year, Mount had two 53-point games plus a 61-point game against conference champ Iowa.Thirty-two of his 61 points were scored in the first half alone. Later research found that if the three-point line had existed in 1970 in the NCAA, he would have scored 74 points in that game, credited with 13 three-point field goals. The official school record is ten, held by Carsen Edwards.

Leading Purdue to an 18-6 season, he averaged 35.4 points a game and took second straight First Team All-American and Big Ten Player Of The Year honors. Mount left as the school's all-time leading scorer with 2,323 points throughout only three varsity seasons. At the time, it was also the Big Ten scoring record, surpassing the total of Indiana's Don Schlundt. It is currently held by Indiana's Calbert Cheaney's 2,613, though Cheaney's career collegiate scoring average of 19.8 falls well short of Mount's 32.3.

Mount scored in double figures for 72 consecutive games while scoring 30-plus points in 46 of those games. Both remain school records. He broke numerous Purdue scoring records that were held by Dave Schellhase and Terry Dischinger. During his career, he led the Boilers to a 56-20 overall record.

Mount never received a national player of the year award. He finished behind UCLA's Lew Alcindor and LSU's Pete Maravich.

Professional career

Indiana Pacers

1970-1971

Mount was considered an excellent pro prospect, but because the general managers of the NBA knew that Mount was already signed by the ABA, he was not drafted  by the Los Angeles Lakers until the middle of the 8th round of the 1970 NBA Draft.  Mount was, however, drafted in the ABA by the Indiana Pacers as the 1st overall pick in 1970. As a result, his legendary status in Indiana made it a foregone conclusion that he would sign with the Indiana Pacers of the rival ABA. At the time, the ABA was the only professional league that featured a three-point line, which worked to Mount's advantage, as he was an outside shooter. During his first season in the ABA, Mount was offered $40,000 from Pro-Keds to wear its new suede basketball shoe. He declined the offer, because he personally preferred Chuck Taylors of the Converse brand.

1971-1972

Playing for head coach Bob "Slick" Leonard, along with such teammates as George McGinnis, Mel Daniels and Bob Netolicky, he led the Pacers to the 1972 ABA Championship against Rick Barry and the New York Nets. He handed off 2.9 assists and averaged 14.2 points a game, racking up 57 three-pointers in his second season as a Pacer. Along with old college teammate Billy Keller and Roger Brown, they made Indiana a constant threat beyond the arc.

Kentucky Colonels

1972-1973

Rick Mount was traded to the Kentucky Colonels for the 1972-73 season. He averaged 15 points a game on the season. Teamed with Dan Issel, he averaged 17 points in playoff games while leading the Colonels to the ABA Finals against his former Pacers.

Utah Stars

1973-1974

In the middle of the 1973-74 season, Rick was traded to the Utah Stars, where he joined Ron Boone. For the third straight season, Mount led a different team to the ABA Finals, eventually losing to the New York Nets.

According to Charley Rosen, Mount displayed the most astounding exhibition of pure, one-on-none shooting he ever saw. Rosen was invited by the Utah coach, Joe Mullaney, to participate in an intra-squad scrimmage. After Mullaney officially terminated the session, several players lingered to play HORSE. Because of Mount, the Stars' rules were unique. Shots had to be perfectly clean, counted only if the ball didn't touch the rim. Despite this wrinkle, Mount won every game. In the end, only Mount and Rosen were left on the court, and Mount was able to adjust the trajectory of every jumper so that the ball hit the inner part of the backside-rim in such a way that the ball would nudge the iron, split the net, and then bounce back to him. He supposedly could do this about 90 percent of the time.

Memphis Sounds

1974-1975

Mount spent the last season of his ABA and professional basketball career playing for the Memphis Sounds. He averaged a career season-high scoring average of 17.1 points a game. His career was cut short due to a dislocated shoulder that he sustained during the 1974-75 season.

Career notes

Mount was amongst the top of the league in three-point shooting during the time he spent in the ABA, while averaging 11.8 points a game and in his career with a total of 3,330 points. Known mainly for his scoring abilities in high school and college, Mount contributed in a greater variety of ways during his pro career. As one of the finest passers in the league, he averaged 2.4 assists, tallying a total of 676. He was also a fine free throw shooter with 82 percent accuracy. Rick shot 31.7 percent beyond the arc and held a 43.3 field goal percentage in his five seasons in the ABA.

After retirement

Today, Mount still lives in his hometown of Lebanon, Indiana, with his wife, Donna. His son, Rich, played on the Purdue basketball team for two seasons (1989–1991) before transferring to VCU. Rich, who also played at Lebanon, left high school with the ninth most points in Indiana high school history. He currently works as a police officer in Lebanon.

Mount currently runs "shoot camps" for high school players throughout the Midwest, where each player will take 2,500 supervised shots. The instructional school is based solely on shooting and there is no scrimmaging involved.

An avid quail hunter in his spare time, he opened Rick Mount's Sports Shop, a hunting and fishing shop. Purdue is among Mount's customers for the "Shoot-A-Way" retrieval system, a device which returns a basketball down a track to a player after a shot. Rick left college 10 credits shy of his degree requirements; that decision later affected his opportunity to be a head coach at an Indiana high school.

In 1992, Mount and his father were both inducted into the Indiana Basketball Hall of Fame, located in New Castle, Indiana.  In 2014, his son, Rich, was named to the Indiana Basketball Hall of Fame's Silver Anniversary Team.

In 2016, Mount gave an interview to the Indianapolis Star where he discussed his career and the public perception of him.

See also

List of NCAA Division I men's basketball players with 60 or more points in a game

References
General
 Jeff Washburn, Tales from Indiana High School Basketball (Sports Publishing 2004).
 Mike Bresnahan, Covered in Glory (Los Angeles Times, January 3, 2003)
 The Lafayette Journal and Courier, Most Memorable Moments In Purdue Basketball History (Sports Publishing 1998)
Specific

External links

 Rick Mount Purdue University Biography
 Rick Mount Shooting Clinic Website

1947 births
Living people
All-American college men's basketball players
American men's basketball players
Basketball players from Indiana
Indiana Pacers draft picks
Indiana Pacers players
Kentucky Colonels players
Los Angeles Lakers draft picks
Memphis Sounds players
Parade High School All-Americans (boys' basketball)
People from Lebanon, Indiana
Purdue Boilermakers men's basketball players
Shooting guards
Utah Stars players